Leslie Rubinstein (Pueblo, CO, June 21, 1939 — Glenview, IL, September 22, 2007) was an American music critic and journalist. She was a regular contributor to Opera News magazine from the mid-1970s through the 1990s. Her first article with the magazine was about stand-by singers at the Metropolitan Opera in 1975. Some of her other work for the magazine included featured stories on Luciano Pavarotti, Jan Peerce, Eleanor Steber and the filming of Francesco Rosi's Carmen.

References

1939 births
2007 deaths
American music critics
American women journalists
American women music critics
People from Pueblo, Colorado
Women writers about music
20th-century American women
20th-century American people
21st-century American women